"Smoke on the Water" is a song by English rock band Deep Purple, first released from the band's sixth studio album Machine Head (1972), which chronicles the 1971 fire at Montreux Casino. 

In a 2004 publication by Rolling Stone magazine "Smoke on the Water" was ranked number 434 on its list of the "500 Greatest Songs of All Time", Total Guitar magazine's ranked "Smoke on the Water" number 4 on its "Greatest Guitar Riffs Ever", and in March 2005, Q magazine placed "Smoke on the Water" at number 12 in its list of the 100 greatest guitar tracks.

Composition

 
"Smoke on the Water" is easily identified by its central theme, developed by guitarist Ritchie Blackmore. It is a four-note blues scale melody in G minor, harmonised in parallel fourths. The riff, played on a Fender Stratocaster electric guitar by Blackmore, is later joined by hi-hat and distorted organ, then the rest of the drums, then electric bass parts before the start of Ian Gillan's vocal.

Blackmore later claimed that the main riff is an interpretation of inversion of Symphony No. 5 by Ludwig van Beethoven, and that "I owe him a lot of money".

Jon Lord doubles the guitar part on a Hammond C3 organ played through a distorted Marshall amp, creating a tone very similar to that of the guitar. Blackmore usually plays the main riff using a finger pluck.

History

The lyrics tell a true story: on 4 December 1971, Deep Purple were in Montreux, Switzerland, to record an album (Machine Head) using a mobile recording studio (rented from the Rolling Stones and known as the Rolling Stones Mobile Studio—referred to as the "Rolling truck Stones thing" and "a mobile" in the lyrics) at the entertainment complex that was part of the Montreux Casino (referred to as "the gambling house" in the song lyric).

On the eve of the recording session, a concert with Frank Zappa and the Mothers of Invention was held in the casino's theatre. This was the theatre's final concert before the casino complex closed down for its annual winter renovations, which would allow Deep Purple to record there. At the beginning of Don Preston's synthesiser solo on "King Kong", the place suddenly caught fire when somebody in the audience fired a flare gun towards the rattan-covered ceiling, as mentioned in the "some stupid with a flare gun" line. Although there were no major injuries, the resulting fire destroyed the entire casino complex, along with all the Mothers' equipment. The "smoke on the water" that became the title of the song (credited to bassist Roger Glover, who related how the title occurred to him when he woke from a dream a few days later) referred to the smoke from the fire spreading over Lake Geneva from the burning casino as the members of Deep Purple watched from their hotel. Glover said that, "It was probably the biggest fire I'd ever seen up to that point and probably ever seen in my life. It was a huge building. I remember there was very little panic getting out, because it didn't seem like much of a fire at first. But, when it caught, it went up like a fireworks display." The "Funky Claude" running in and out is referring to Claude Nobs, the director of the Montreux Jazz Festival who helped some of the audience escape the fire. Swiss police named Zdeněk Špička, a Czechoslovak refugee living in Épalinges, as a suspect in the case, but he fled Switzerland shortly after.

Left with an expensive mobile recording unit and no place to record, the band was forced to scout the town for another place to set up. One promising venue (found by Nobs) was a local theatre, the Pavilion, but soon after the band loaded in and started working/recording, neighbours took offence at the noise. The band was only able to lay down backing tracks for one song (based on Blackmore's riff and temporarily named "Title No.1"), before local police shut them down.

After about a week of searching, the band rented the nearly-empty Grand Hôtel de Territet and converted its hallways and stairwells into a makeshift studio, where they laid down most of the tracks for what would become their most commercially successful album, Machine Head (which is dedicated to Claude Nobs).

The only song from Machine Head not recorded entirely in the Grand Hotel was "Smoke on the Water" itself, which had been partly recorded during the abortive Pavilion session. Its lyrics were composed later, primarily by Gillan and based around Glover's title, and the vocals were recorded in the Grand Hotel.

Because of the incident and the exposure Montreux received when "Smoke on the Water" became an international hit, Deep Purple formed a lasting bond with the town. The song was honoured in Montreux by a sculpture along the lake shore (right next to the statue of Queen frontman Freddie Mercury on the concrete wall right below the Marché couvert) with the band's name, the song title, and the riff in musical notes. However, this monument has been removed and has not been there since at least 2017. The new casino in Montreux displays notes from the riff as decoration on its balustrade facing the gambling hall. The only other memorial in Montreux dedicated to the band's song is a small plaque placed outside the back entrance of the former Grand Hôtel de Territet, the building in whose hallways the album Machine Head was partially recorded.

On the Classic Albums episode about Machine Head, Blackmore claimed that friends of the band were not fans of the "Smoke on the Water" riff, which they thought too simplistic. Blackmore retorted by making comparisons to the first movement of Beethoven's 5th Symphony, which revolves around a similar four-note arrangement.

"The amazing thing with that song, and Ritchie's riff in particular," observed Ian Paice, "is that somebody hadn't done it before, because it's so gloriously simple and wonderfully satisfying."

Impact

"Smoke on the Water" was included on Machine Head, which was released in early 1972, but was not released as a single until a year later, in May 1973. ("Never Before" and "Highway Star" were the first singles issued from the album.) The band members have said that they did not expect the song to be a hit, but the single reached number 4 on the Billboard pop singles chart in the United States during the summer of 1973, reached number 2 on the Canadian RPM charts, and propelled the album to the top 10 more than a year after its release. Live performances of the tune, featuring extended interplay between Blackmore's guitar and Jon Lord's Hammond organ, would become a centrepiece of Deep Purple's concerts, as in the live version found on the album Made in Japan. Warner Brothers included the live version of "Smoke on the Water" from Made in Japan as the B-side of the "Smoke on the Water" studio single.

The principal songwriters included the song within their subsequent solo ventures after Deep Purple had split up. Ian Gillan in particular performed a jazz-influenced version in early solo concerts. The band Gillan adopted a feedback-soaked approach, courtesy of Gillan guitarist Bernie Torme. The song was also featured live by Ritchie Blackmore's post-Deep Purple band Rainbow during their tours 1981–83, and again after Rainbow were resurrected briefly in the mid-1990s and for three European concerts in June 2016.

During Ian Gillan's stint with Black Sabbath in 1983, they performed "Smoke on the Water" as a regular repertoire number on encores during their only tour together. It remains one of the few cover songs that Black Sabbath have ever played live.

Accolades 
"Smoke on the Water" has received the following rankings:
 426 on Rolling Stone magazine's The 500 Greatest Songs of All Time (2004)
 37 in VH1's 40 Greatest Metal Songs
 12 in Q magazine's 100 Greatest Guitar Tracks (March 2005)
 11 in VH1's "100 Greatest Hard Rock Songs" (January 2009)
 4 in Total Guitar magazine's "Top 20 Greatest Guitar Riffs Ever"

Personnel
 Ritchie Blackmore – guitar
 Ian Gillan – lead and backing vocals
 Roger Glover – bass guitar
 Jon Lord – Hammond organ
 Ian Paice – drums

Chart history

Weekly charts

Year-end charts

Certifications

Rock Aid Armenia version

Rock Aid Armenia, a charity project to help victims of 1988 Armenian earthquake made a charity re-recording of Deep Purple's "Smoke on the Water", with different vocalists singing various verses. The single made it to the UK Top 40 Singles Chart.

The rock musicians involved in the recording included Bryan Adams, Ritchie Blackmore, Bruce Dickinson, Geoff Downes, Keith Emerson, Ian Gillan, David Gilmour, Tony Iommi, Alex Lifeson, Brian May, Paul Rodgers, Chris Squire and Roger Taylor. The track's producers were Gary Langan and Geoff Downes.

In world records
In 1994, in Vancouver, British Columbia, Canada, 1,322 guitarists gathered to play the world-famous riff all at the same time for a place in the Guinness Book of World Records. On Sunday 3 June 2007, in Kansas City this record was topped with 1,721 guitarists, and again just 20 days later, in the German city of Leinfelden-Echterdingen by the group 'Party Blues in Bb' with over 1,800 other people involved. 
The record was again topped on 1 May 2009, in Wrocław, Poland, when 6,346 guitar players, joined by current Deep Purple guitarist Steve Morse, performed the song during the Thanks Jimi Festival.

See also
 Blues rock
 Swiss Cheese/Fire!, a recording of the concert in which the Montreux Casino fire occurred (included in Frank Zappa's Beat the Boots! II compilation)

References

Further reading

External links
 Official Deep Purple website
 Smoke on the Water review and back story at Eat Sleep Guitar Repeat

Deep Purple songs
1972 songs
1973 singles
Frank Zappa
Songs about Switzerland
Songs written by Ritchie Blackmore
Songs written by Ian Gillan
Songs written by Roger Glover
Songs written by Jon Lord
Songs written by Ian Paice
Songs based on actual events
EMI Records singles
Warner Records singles
1989 singles
Charity singles
Song recordings produced by Gary Langan
Montreux